Courtney Peak may refer to:
 Courtney Peak (Antarctica)
 Courtney Peak (Washington)